This is a list of notable people from the city of Karachi in Pakistan, also known as Karachiites:

Armed forces
 Vice Admiral Syed Mohammad Ahsan  - governor
 Muhammad Mahmood Alam
 Mirza Aslam Beg - four-star general
 Moinuddin Haider - lieutenant general, governor
 Pervez Musharraf - former President and Army Chief of Pakistan
 Ft. Lt. Rashid Minhas Shaheed - only PAF recipient of Nishan-e-Haider
 Marium Mukhtiar Pakistan's first female martyred fighter pilot in the line of duty.

Art and literature
 Minocher K. Spencer  Parsi author and spiritual healer from Karachi (born October 4, 1888 Pune, India)
 Jamiluddin Aali - poet, columnist, critic (born 1926 in Delhi)
 Mohammad Abdul Ahed - architect, educator, painter (1919-2001)
 Manzoor Ahmad - philosopher (born 1934)
 Obaidullah Aleem - journalist, poet (1939-1998)
 Ahmed Ali - novelist, poet, critic, translator, diplomat and scholar (1910 in New Delhi - 1994 in Karachi)
 Nasim Amrohvi - Urdu poet, philosopher, and lexicographer (1908-1987)
 Qaem Amrohvi - poet, philosopher (1919 Amroha, India - 1990 Karachi)
 Rais Amrohvi - journalist, poet, psychoanalyst (1914-1988)
 Iftikhar Arif - poet, critic, author (born 1943)
 Hasan Askari - philosopher, author, critic (1919-1978)
 Zamir Ali Badayuni - critic (1941-2003)
 Fatima Surayya Bajia - drama writer (born 1930)
 Tabish Dehlvi - poet (1911-2004)
 Jon Elia - Arsalan Kachaliya's favorite poet, philosopher (1931-2002)
 Aslam Farrukhi - writer, critic, linguist (born 1923)
 Farman Fatehpuri - researcher, poet, critic, linguist (1926-2013)
 Dilawar Figar - humorous poet, scholar (1929 Badaun, UP - 1998 Karachi)
 Zaib-un-Nissa Hamidullah - first female columnist of Pakistan (1921-2000)
 Maulvi Abdul Haq - father of modern Urdu (1872-1961)
 Shan-ul-Haq Haqqee - Urdu poet, writer, journalist, broadcaster, translator, critic, researcher, linguist and lexicographer
 Hameed Haroon - journalist, activist 
 Sibte Hassan - author, columnist, activist (1916-1986)     
 Zahida Hina - columnist, author, poet (born 1946)
 Ashfaq Hussain - Urdu poet and television personality in Canada for Asian Television Network (born 1951)
 Intizar Hussain - linguist, novelist, critic (born 1923)
 Ibn-e-Insha - poet, writer and humorist (1927 Phillaur, Punjab, British India - 1978 London, England)
 Ibn-e-Safi - novelist, story writer  (1928 Nara, district of Allahabad, UP, British India - 1980 Karachi)
 Shaista Suhrawardy Ikramullah - writer, activist (1915-2000)
 Farhat Ishtiaq - writer, author and screenwriter (born June 23, 1980)
 Siddiq Ismail - religious Hamd and Naat reciter (born 1954)
 Qamar Jalalvi - poet (1887 Jalali, Aligarh, India - 1968 Karachi)
 Jameel Jalibi - scholar, critic, linguist, former VC KU (born 1929)
 Abul Khair Kashfi - critic, linguist, author, scholar (1932 Kanpur, British India - 2008 Karachi)
 Khalique Ibrahim Khalique - journalist, poet, critic (1926-2006) 
 Ghulam Mustafa Khan - writer, critic, linguist, researcher, scholar, educationist (1912-2005)
 Josh Malihabadi - poet, linguist, scholar (1894-1982)
 Anwar Maqsood - drama writer, anchor, actor (born 1935 Hyderabad State)
 Haseena Moin - playwright, drama writer 
 Zehra Nigah - poet
 Pirzada Qasim - poet, author, educationist (born 1943)
 Ishtiaq Hussain Qureshi - author, historian, educationist (1903-1981) 
 Fahmida Riaz - writer, poet, activist (born 1946 Meerut, UP, British India)
 Sadequain - painter, calligraphist (1930 Amroha, British India - 1987 Karachi)
 Hakeem Muhammad Said - pioneer of Eastern medicine, philanthropist (1993-1994)
 Abul Lais Siddiqui - critic, linguist, author, scholar
 Shaukat Siddiqui - novelist, fiction writer (1923-2006)
 Raees Warsi - journalist, author, poet, founder of Urdu Markaz New York (born 1963)
 Mushtaq Ahmed Yousfi - author, humorist (born 1923)
 Mustafa Zaidi - poet (1930-1970)
 Kashan Admani - musician

Bankers
 Agha Hasan Abedi - banker and founder of the now-defunct Bank of Credit and Commerce International
 Shaukat Aziz - former Prime Minister of Pakistan
 Ishrat Hussain - former Governor State Bank of Pakistan and incumbent Dean of Institute of Business Administration

Businessmen

 Abdul Razzak Yaqoob, Chairman of the ARY Group
 Agha Hasan Abedi - banker, founder of BCCI
 Bashir Ali Mohammad, Gul Ahmed Group
 Hussain Haqqani - leading Urdu debater, National College, Karachi; Ambassador of Pakistan to U.S.A.
 Jahangir Siddiqui, owner of JS Group
 Javed Jabbar - orator, politician, Senator
 Malik Riaz - Pakistani business tycoon who is the founder of Bahria Town.
 Monis Rahman - Founder & CEO of Naseeb Networks
 Rafiq M. Habib - Group chairman of the renowned ‘House of Habib’, chairman of Habib Insurance Company Ltd.
 Raza Rabbani - English debater, politician, Senator
 Sadruddin Hashwani - Founder and chairman of Hashoo Group.
 Safi Qureshi - co-founder and CEO of AST Research; born and educated in Karachi; now based in the US
 Sikandar Sultan - Managing Director of Shan Food Industries

Debaters and orators
 Hussain Haqqani - leading Urdu debater, National College, Karachi; Ambassador of Pakistan to U.S.A.
 Javed Jabbar - orator, politician, Senator
 Raza Rabbani - English debater, politician, Senator

Economists
 Ishrat Hussain - former Governor State Bank of Pakistan
 Akhtar Hameed Khan - pioneer of microcredit and microfinance in Pakistan, founder of Orangi Pilot Project
 Nawab Haider Naqvi - former Director PIDE
 Anwar Shaikh - Marxist economist, and professor
 Muhammad Shoaib - Finance Minister; Executive Director World Bank; father of Nafisa Sadik

Education
 Anita Ghulam Ali - educationist
 Nasim Amrohvi
 Moinuddin Aqeel - author, critic, linguist, scholar
 Bernadette Louise Dean - former Principal of Kinnaird College, Lahore
 Mary Emily - recipient of the Sitara-e-Imtiaz for services to education
 Aslam Farrukhi - author, poet, critic, linguist, scholar
 Farman Fatehpuri - real name Syed Dildar Ali; author, critic, linguist, scholar
 Khalida Ghous - human rights activist, scholar
 Yolande Henderson - high school teacher
 Jameel Jalibi - linguist, scholar
 Abul Khair Kashfi - author, critic, linguist, scholar
 Matin Ahmed Khan - academic, marketing expert and management educator, Dean and Director of the Institute of Business Administration 
 Ghulam Mustafa Khan - author, critic, linguist, scholar, Sufi
 Anthony Theodore Lobo - founder of many schools
 Ishtiaq Hussain Qureshi - VC Karachi University, author, historian, scholar
 Ata ur Rahman - Chairman HEC, scientist
 Hakim Saeed - VC Hamdard University
 Abul Lais Siddiqui - author, critic, linguist, scholar
 Pirzada Qasim Raza Siddiqui - Chancellor, Karachi University
 Raziuddin Siddiqui - physicist, mathematician, scholar
 Shahid Aziz Siddiqi - former Federal Secretary and Vice Chancellor, Ziauddin University
 Norma Fernandes - former Headmistress (Kindergarten/Junior Section) of the Karachi Grammar School

Journalists
 Cyril Almeida
 Mujahid Barelvi
 Ardeshir Cowasjee
 Ian Fyfe, sports journalist 
 Kamran Khan
 Daniele Mastrogiacomo - Italian journalist born in Karachi
 Arshad Sharif
 Waseem Badami
 Maria Memon
 Shahid Masood

Law and judiciary
 Justice Syed Sajjad Ali Shah - CJS, Chief Justice of Sindh High Court from Karachi.
 Justice Wajihuddin Ahmed - Chief Justice Sind High Court and Judge Supreme Court of Pakistan
 Justice Alvin Robert Cornelius  
 Mohammad Haleem - former Chief Justice of Pakistan
 Makhdoom Ali Khan - former Attorney General of Pakistan
 Naimatullah Khan - advocate
 Justice Ajmal Mian - former Chief Justice of Pakistan
 Justice Dorab Patel 
 Nazim Hussain Siddiqui - former Chief Justice of Pakistan
 Justice Haziqul Khairi - former Chief Justice Federal Shariat Court of Pakistan
 Justice Saeeduzzaman Siddiqui - former Chief Justice of Pakistan
 Justice Rana Bhagwandas - former acting Chief Justice of Pakistan
 Justice Nasir Aslam Zahid - former Chief Justice Sindh High Court and Justice Pakistan Supreme Court of Pakistan
 Khalid Jawed Khan Attorney General for Pakistan

Performing arts

Actors and comedians
 Moin Akhter - TV, film and stage actor, comedian and host
 Somy Ali, actress and activist
 Jamshed Ansari - comedian
 Hina Dilpazeer - actress, TV host, model
 Mehwish Hayat - actress, model
 Urwa Hocane - actress
 Adeel Hussain - model, actress
 Talat Hussain - television actor, director
 Adnan Jaffar - television, film actor
 Ather Shah Khan Jaidi  Writer comedian
 Syed Kamal - film actor
 Kaveeta - actress
 Aiza Khan - actress, model
 Rauf Lala - comedian, actor
 Margaret Lockwood - film and stage actress (1916-1990)
 Anwar Maqsood - drama writer, anchor, actor
 Nadeem - film actor
 Kumail Nanjiani - comedian
 Salim Nasir - comedian, actor
 Nirala (real name Muzaffar Hussain) - comedian
 Fawad Khan - actor
 Izhar Qazi - film and TV actor
 Zainab Qayyum - model, actress, TV host
 Humayun Saeed - actor, model and producer
 Sangeeta - actress, filmmaker, director
 Ayaz Samoo - comedian, actor
 Zhalay Sarhadi - model, actress
 Saud Qasmi - actor
 Sami Shah - comedian, writer
 Umer Sharif - comic actor
 Iqbal Theba - Pakistani-American television actor
 Angela Thorne - English actress 
 Iman Vellani - Pakistani-Canadian television actor
 Syra Yousuf - model, actress
 Zafar Karachiwala, Indian actor, ancestors from Karachi
 Azfar Rehman - actor
 Nadia Hussain - model, actress
 Fatima Effendi - model, actress
 Danish Taimoor - actor
 Fahad Mustafa - actor
 Mohib Mirza - actor
 Babar Ali - actor
 Aijaz Aslam - actor
 Behroze Sabzwari - film actor
 Sajid Hasan - actor
 Shehroz Sabzwari - actor
 Danish Nawaz - actor
 Yasir Nawaz - actor
 Madiha Imam - model, actress
 Mawra Hocane - model, actress
 Ahad Raza Mir - actor
 Yumna Zaidi - actress
 Mahira Khan - television, film actor
 Aamina Sheikh - model, actress
 Momal Sheikh - actress
 Alizeh Shah - model, actress
 Sana Javed - model, actress
 Iqra Aziz - model, actress
 Aiman Khan - actress
 Minal Khan - actress
 Muneeb Butt - actor
 Bushra Ansari - actress, comedian
 Mashal Khan - actress
 Hina Altaf - actress
 Bilal Abbas Khan - actor
 Ramsha Khan - model, actress

Singers, musicians and music  & directors

 Salma Agha - singer
 Alamgir - pop singer
 Sajjad Ali - singer
 Waqar Ali - singer and musician
 Faraz Anwar - guitarist
 Iqbal Bano - ghazal singer
 Nisar Bazmi - composer
 Munni Begum - singer
 Ali Haider - singer
 Mehdi Hassan - ghazal singer
 Nazia Hassan - first female pop singer of Pakistan
 Zohaib Hassan - singer
 Mehreen Jabbar - Pakistani film director
 Ahmed Jahanzeb - singer
 S. B. John - singer
 Faisal Kapadia - singer
 Bilal Maqsood - composer
 Habib Wali Mohammad - singer
 Sohail Rana - composer
 Shehzad Roy - singer
 Ahmed Rushdi - singer
 Ramesh Sippy Indian film director and producer from Karachi.
 Syed Ali Raza Usama - Pakistani film and drama director
 Lenny Zakatek - English pop and rock star

Dancers
 Sheema Kermani social activist, theater director and exponent of Bharatnatyam dance.

Philanthropists and social workers
Somy Ali - activist, filmmaker, and former actress and model
 Ansar Burney - human rights activist and founder of the Ansar Burney Trust
 Abdul Sattar Edhi - philanthropist and founder of the Edhi Foundation
 Bilquis Edhi - philanthropist, founder of the Bilquis Edhi Foundation, wife of Abdul Sattar Edhi
 Ruth Lewis - awarded Sitara-i-Imtiaz for managing Darul Sukun, a home for the disabled
 Fatima Lodhi - social worker, founder of Dark is Divine, first anti-colorism campaign from Pakistan
 Fahmida Riaz
 Hakim Said - scholar, philanthropist, former Governor of Sindh
 Nafis Sadik - United Nations
 Ramzan Chhipa - philanthropist and founder of the Chhipa Welfare Association

Politicians and bureaucrats
 Lal Krishna Advani - Former Deputy Prime Minister of India and co-founder of the Bharatiya Janata Party in India
 Abdul Sattar Afghani - ex-Mayor Karachi Metropolitan City
 Shaukat Aziz - former Prime Minister and Finance Minister of Pakistan
 Benazir Bhutto - former Prime Minister
 Fakhruddin G. Ebrahim - Governor, Law Minister, Attorney General
 Imran Farooq - co-founder of MQM
 Syed Munawar Hasan - former Ameer of Jamaat-e-Islami
 Altaf Hussain - founder and chairman of Muttahida Qaumi Movement (MQM)
 Fatima Jinnah - sister of Muhammad Ali Jinnah and Madar-i-Millet
 Muhammad Ali Jinnah - founder of Pakistan
 Syed Mustafa Kamal - former Nazim (Mayor) of Karachi
 Ishrat-ul-Ibad Khan - former Governor of Sindh 
 Naimatullah Khan - former Mayor of Karachi city
 Shahryar Khan - former Foreign Secretary and former Chairman of the Cricket Board in Pakistan
 Jamshed Nusserwanjee Mehta - Mayor of Karachi
 Pervez Musharraf - General (Retd.), former Army Chief, military dictator and President of Pakistan
 Farooq Sattar - parliamentary leader of the MQM
 Ahmad Noorani Siddiqi - leader of the Jamiat Ulema-e-Pakistan; founder of the World Islamic Mission
 Azeem Ahmed Tariq - former chairman of MQM
 Harchandrai Vishandas - former mayor of Karachi (during 1900s)
 Ali Zaidi - Pakistan Tahreek e insaaf
Asif Ali Zardari - former president of Pakistan 
 Bilawal Bhutto Zardari - Chairman of Pakistan People's Party
 Ibrahim Ismail Chundrigar  sixth Prime Minister of Pakistan, former Pakistani ambassador to Turkey
 Hussain Haroon Permanent Representative of Pakistan to the United Nations
 Ghulam Akbar Lasi - Pakistani politician
 Faisal Vawda - Pakistani politician
 Muhammad Zubair Umar - former Governor of Sindh 
 Imran Ismail - former Governor of Sindh 
 Murad Ali Shah - Chief Minister of Sindh
 Hafiz Naeem ur Rehman - Pakistani politician
 Saeed Ghani - Pakistani politician
 Khalid Maqbool Siddiqui - Pakistani politician
 Khurrum Sher Zaman - Pakistani politician
 Firdous Shamim Naqvi - Pakistani politician
 Khawaja Izharul Hassan - Pakistani politician
 Faisal Subzwari - Pakistani politician
 Syed Aminul Haque - Pakistani politician

Religious leaders and scholars
 Talib Jauhari - religious scholar
 Aga Khan III - Imam Sultan Mohammed Shah - 48th Imam of Shia Imami Ismaili Muslims, President League of Nations, President All India Muslim League and GCSI, GCMG
 Muhammad Ilyas Qadri - founder of Dawat-e-Islami 
 Muhammad Muslehuddin Siddiqui
 Godrej Sidhwa A Parsi Zoroastrian priest
 Taqi Usmani - religious scholar
 Rafi Usmani - religious scholar
 Mufti Muhammad Naeem - religious scholar

Saints 
 Abdullah Shah Ghazi  was an eighth-century (c. 720) mystic Sufi, whose shrine is located in the Clifton, Karachi.

Scientists
 Salimuzzaman Siddiqui - chemist
 Abdul Qadeer Khan - metallurgist and founder of Pakistan's nuclear programme
 Atta ur Rahman - chemist
 Raziuddin Siddiqui - astrophysicist and mathematician
 Ziauddin Ahmed
 Muhammad Ali Shah - orthopaedic surgeon
 M. Shahid Qureshi - astrophysicist and mathematician
 Pervez Hoodbhoy - nuclear physicist
 Ahmed Mohiuddin - zoologist
 Muhammad Qudrat-i-Khuda

Sportspersons

Badminton players

 Palwasha Bashir
 Mahoor Shahzad

Cricketers

Footballer
 Saddam Hussain  
 Hajra Khan - captain of the Pakistan women's national football team

Hockey players
 Sohail Abbas
 Mansoor Ahmed
 Jack Britto (Olympian)
 Hanif Khan
 Shahid Ali Khan
 Hassan Sardar
 Islahuddin Siddique

Sprinters
 John Permal, He was the fastest man in Pakistan
 Naseem Hameed

Swimmer
 Mumtaz Ahmed - olympian

Historical personalities
 Mai Kolachi incumbent name of Karachi is derived from this fisher woman.

Miscellaneous
 Bashir Ahmad
 Tazeen Ahmad
 Chaudhry Muhammad Ali
 Jacqueline Maria Dias, professor of nursing
 Jacob Harris, first-class cricketer and sports coach
 Lady Abdullah Haroon
 Agha Hilaly
 Aamir Liaquat Hussain
 Junaid Jamshed
 Siddiq Ismail
 Farahnaz Ispahani
 Shadab Kabir
 Jahangir Khan
 Yousuf Ludhianvi
 Iskander Mirza
 Abdur Rab Nishtar
 Arman Sabir
 Benny Mario Travas
 Kamal Warsi
 Irfan Yusuf

See also 
List of Muhajir people
List of Pakistanis

References

Karachi District
People from Karachi District